The Old Wykehamist cricket team was a first-class cricket team made up of former students of Winchester College in Winchester, England.

History
The team played one match with first-class status in July 1817 against the Old Etonians at Lord's, winning the match by 72 runs. The modern day Old Wykehamist Cricket Club was founded in 1874.

Old Etonians v Old Wykehamists, 1817

References

1817 establishments in England
Cricket in Hampshire
Winchester College
Former senior cricket clubs